Blue Eagle was a settlement founded in the 1870s on what is now the west side of Westbrook, Minnesota, United States.

References

Former populated places in Minnesota
Former populated places in Cottonwood County, Minnesota